Oldříška "Olina" Hátlová-Tylová (born 25 December 1943) is a Czech former luger. She competed for Czechoslovakia at the 1964 Winter Olympics and the 1968 Winter Olympics. She emigrated to Germany after the Prague Spring in 1968 and used the surname Nagenrauft after her marriage to Leonhard Nagenrauft, a West German luger.

References

External links
 

1943 births
Living people
Czech female lugers
Olympic lugers of Czechoslovakia
Lugers at the 1964 Winter Olympics
Lugers at the 1968 Winter Olympics
People from Teplice nad Bečvou
Sportspeople from the Olomouc Region